Kwadwo Quentin Kankam (born 20 January 1997), better known by his stage name Novelist, is a British grime MC and record producer from Lewisham in South London. He was a founding member of the Square crew and was nominated for Best Grime Act at the 2014 MOBO Awards. He has been called the "new face of grime" and was described as "the poster child for the first generation of real grime kids" by DJ Logan Sama.

Career
In 2013 Novelist clashed with Wiley's younger brother Cadell for the grime DVD Who's Da Boss and began to garner attention from the UK underground music scene for his regular appearances on London pirate radio stations. Novelist was featured in a BBC Radio 1Xtra documentary broadcast on mother's day called Grime Mums focusing on the role parents played in the careers of prominent grime MCs. After an instrumental track called "Sniper" began to receive airplay on London underground radio stations Novelist was signed to produce an instrumental EP for influential grime imprint Oil Gang. He recorded a song entitled "Take Time" in a studio session with experimental producer Mumdance in October 2013, which was later signed to Rinse and released as a single in the summer of 2014.

In early 2014, Novelist's music began receiving regular rotation on radio stations including BBC Radio 1Xtra and Rinse FM. He recorded a guest set for DJ Cable's "Sixty Minutes" mix, which was broadcast on MistaJam's BBC 1Xtra show on 28 May 2014, he featured on Cable's Sixty Minutes mix again later that year recording a second guest set with his crew The Square. In late 2013 Novelist began working with No Hats No Hoods. In mid-2014, the label signed The Square, their first release on the label The Formula came out in August 2014. In 2014, Novelist signed to XL Recordings and recorded a track with Jamie xx for his forthcoming release on the label, however the track was not released. In September 2014, Novelist received a MOBO nomination in the Best Grime Act category. In November 2014, Novelist was named on the longlist for the BBCs Sound of 2015 list and XL Recordings announced that his debut release on the label would be a collaborative EP with Mumdance. The EP, entitled 1 Sec was released on 20 January 2015, the same day he turned 18.

On 1 September 2015, Novelist left the Square with the stated intention of furthering his solo career. On 17 October 2015, Novelist supported Major Lazer at Alexandra Palace, London, during their European tour. In early 2016, he featured on a Baauer single called "Day Ones" and appeared on Skepta's 2016 Mercury-winning album Konnichiwa with "Lyrics".

In August 2016, Novelist was dropped from XL Recordings. He subsequently announced on 23 August that he is launching MMMYEH Records as his own label to release his own music along with his friends. On 13 April 2018, Novelist released his debut album, Novelist Guy. The album charted on the UK iTunes Charts for a single day after its release at No. 38 and was a commercial failure, but in July 2018 was announced as a shortlisted album for the 2018 Mercury Prize, losing out to Visions of a Life by Wolf Alice.

Personal life
In June 2016, Novelist joined the Labour Party and supported Labour Party leader Jeremy Corbyn after a leadership challenge. He tweeted: "Been supporting but now it's official." and "@jeremycorbyn Do not resign. The mandem need you." In May 2017, Novelist wrote an essay endorsing Corbyn in the 2017 UK general election. He wrote, "I'm an advocate for Jeremy Corbyn, because he is an advocate for that same message. It's not even necessarily that I care about Labour, but I know that Corbyn possesses a sense of decency that I rarely see in politicians. I relate to the things that he speaks on and how he articulates himself. He doesn't try to confuse the general public – he connects with them. There are a lot of politicians that speak purposefully to distance themselves from the average person, which helps them get away with so many things. Corbyn makes it very simple."

Novelist is a supporter of Manchester United F.C.

Novelist is of Antiguan and Ghanaian descent.

Discography

Studio albums

Extended plays

With the Square

Singles

Guest appearances

References

1997 births
Living people
Black British musicians
English male rappers
English people of Ghanaian descent
English people of Antigua and Barbuda descent
English record producers
Grime music artists
Rappers from London
People from Lewisham
XL Recordings artists
Labour Party (UK) people